Malacoptila is a genus of puffbirds in the family Bucconidae, one of ten genera.

The genus Malacoptila was introduced in 1841 by the English zoologist George Robert Gray. The name combines the Ancient Greek malakos meaning "soft" with ptilon meaning "plumage" or "feather". The type species is the white-chested puffbird.

Extant Species
The genus contains the following seven species:

References

 
Taxa named by George Robert Gray
Taxonomy articles created by Polbot